Eeramana Rojave is a 1991 Indian Tamil-language film, writte, directed and produced by Keyaar. The film stars newcomer Shiva, Mohini, Srividya and Nassar. It was released on 12 January 1991.

Plot 
Shanthi and Siva go to the same college and after some initial misunderstandings, fall in love. A psychotic fellow student, known as Helmet, tortures any couple he sees that are in love. He's sadistic and despises love. Shanthi's friend Anitha and her boyfriend Ravi are killed by Helmet. This spurs Shanthi to stand up against him. Helmet conspires to get Siva expelled as revenge and Shanthi, in turn, has Helmet arrested. Shanthi's rich father JK (Nassar) learns about his daughter's love and arranges her marriage with the son of his friend. The young couple run away with the help of Shanthi's grandmother (Srividya) but fall into Helmet's sadistic hands. The young couple must escape his clutches and change JK's mind.

Cast 

Shiva as Shiva
Mohini as Shanthi
Srividya as Shanthi's Grand Mother
Nassar as JK
Vennira Aadai Moorthy as Tamil Professor
Chinni Jayanth as Maari
Kula Deivam V. R. Rajagopal as Chellaiah
Kumarimuthu
Thyagu
Disco Shanthi
Hema

Production 
Eeramana Rojave is the acting debut of Shiva and Mohini.

Soundtrack 
The music was composed by Ilaiyaraaja. For the dubbed Telugu version Premalekhalu, all songs were written by Rajasri.

Release and reception 
Eeramana Rojave was released on 12 January 1991. N. Krishnaswamy of The Indian Express wrote, "Despite the cliched theme the script maintains the suspense."

References

External links 
 

1990s Tamil-language films
1991 films
Films directed by Keyaar
Films scored by Ilaiyaraaja